Duck Village. A Tale. is a 1976 Soviet family film directed by Boris Buneev.

Plot 
The film tells about a girl named Olya, who spends her holidays with her grandmother and learns from her that a brownie lives in their house. Believing this, she saw him and spent all his holidays with him.

Cast 
 Rolan Bykov as Shishok
 Oksana Duben as Olya
 Evdokiya Alekseeva as Babushka (as Ye. Alekseyeva)
 Elena Sanaeva as Taisyia
 Aleksandr Potapov as Albert
 Vadim Zakharchenko as Prokhor (as V. Zakharchenko)
 Georgiy Millyar as mister Brauni (as G. Millyar)
 Vadim Aleksandrov as Professor (as V. Aleksandrov)
 Sergey Remizov as Yevgeny

References

External links 
 

1976 films
1970s Russian-language films
Soviet children's films